Created by combining: Number of guns per capita by country and List of countries by intentional homicide rate.